"Working Man's Ph.D." is a song co-written and recorded by American country music artist Aaron Tippin.  It was released in June 1993 as the lead-off single from his album Call of the Wild.  It peaked at number 7 in the United States, and number 6 in Canada.  It was written by Tippin, Philip Douglas, and Bobby Boyd.

Content
The song describes the life of a working man with some Pride, Honor, and Dignity.

Music video
The music video was directed by Jon Small.

Chart positions
"Working Man's Ph.D." debuted on the U.S. Billboard Hot Country Singles & Tracks for the week of June 26, 1993.

Year-end charts

References

1993 songs
1993 singles
Aaron Tippin songs
Songs written by Aaron Tippin
Song recordings produced by Scott Hendricks
RCA Records singles
Songs written by Bobby Boyd (songwriter)
Songs about labor